Arianne B. Cope is an American Latter-day Saint novelist.

Cope has written many articles for such LDS Church publications as the New Era.

Cope has been a recipient of the Marilyn Brown Novel Award from the Association for Mormon Letters for her novel The Coming of Elijah. This novel has been criticized for its portrayal of the LDS Church's Indian Placement Program.

Cope has also been the editor of the Tremonton Ledger, a newspaper published in Tremonton, Utah.

Notes

External links 
 "Stowaway" by Arianne Cope in Literary Mama
 Article on Cope winning the Marilyn Brown award

American Latter Day Saint writers
Living people
American women novelists
Novelists from Utah
21st-century American novelists
21st-century American women writers
Latter Day Saints from Utah
People from Tremonton, Utah
American women non-fiction writers
21st-century American non-fiction writers
Year of birth missing (living people)